Lincoln Industries Corp., also known as Progress Rail Services Corporation - Signals Division, manufactures railroad signal products sold to customers throughout North America. Founded in 1985, Lincoln Industries has been part of Caterpillar Inc. as a subsidiary of Progress Rail Services Corporation since January 8, 1998 and is organized under Progress Rail's Engineering and Track Services (ETS) group. Lincoln Industries maintains a headquarters and manufacturing facility in Louisville, Kentucky, a manufacturing facility in Jacksonville, Florida and has access to Progress Rail facilities throughout North America for staging materials.

Products
Lincoln Industries manufactures railroad/highway grade crossing safety warning devices, various signaling devices, and railroad right-of-way maintenance and rail-handling equipment.

Services
Lincoln Industries repairs and leases railroad right-of-way maintenance and rail-handling equipment.

References

External links
, Lincoln Industries website
Progress Rail Services Signals Division

Caterpillar Inc. subsidiaries
Manufacturing companies based in Louisville, Kentucky
Railway signalling manufacturers
Manufacturing companies established in 1985
American companies established in 1985
1985 establishments in Kentucky